Amt Plessa is an Amt ("collective municipality") in the district of Elbe-Elster, in Brandenburg, Germany. Its seat is in Plessa.

The Amt Plessa consists of the following municipalities:
Gorden-Staupitz
Hohenleipisch
Plessa 
Schraden

Demography

References

Plessa
Elbe-Elster